Al-Muroor Sport Club, is an Iraqi football team based in Sadr City, Baghdad, that plays in Iraq Division one.

Managerial history
  Adel Ajar
  Haider Karim
  Hazim Salih
  Taiseer Abdul-Hussein
  Rashid Sultan

See also 
 2021–22 Iraq FA Cup 
 2022–23 Iraq FA Cup

References

External links
 Al-Muroor SC on Goalzz.com
 Iraq Clubs- Foundation Dates

Football clubs in Iraq
2018 establishments in Iraq
Association football clubs established in 2018
Football clubs in Baghdad